The twenty-first problem of the 23 Hilbert problems, from the celebrated list put forth in 1900 by David Hilbert, concerns the existence of a certain class of linear differential equations with specified singular points and monodromic group.

Statement
The original problem was stated as follows (English translation from 1902):

Proof of the existence of linear differential equations having a prescribed monodromic group

In the theory of linear differential equations with one independent variable z, I wish to indicate an important problem one which very likely Riemann himself may have had in mind. This problem is as follows: To show that there always exists a linear differential equation of the Fuchsian class, with given singular points and monodromic group. The problem requires the production of n functions of the variable z, regular throughout the complex z-plane except at the given singular points; at these points the functions may become infinite of only finite order, and when z describes circuits about these points the functions shall undergo the prescribed linear substitutions. The existence of such differential equations has been shown to be probable by counting the constants, but the rigorous proof has been obtained up to this time only in the particular case where the fundamental equations of the given substitutions have roots all of absolute magnitude unity.  has given this proof, based upon Poincaré's theory of the Fuchsian zeta-functions. The theory of linear differential equations would evidently have a more finished appearance if the problem here sketched could be disposed of by some perfectly general method.

Definitions
In fact it is more appropriate to speak not about differential equations but about linear systems of differential equations: in order to realise any monodromy by a differential equation one has to admit, in general, the presence of additional apparent singularities, i.e. singularities with trivial local monodromy. In more modern language, the (systems of) differential equations in question are those defined in the complex plane, less a few points, and with a regular singularity at those. A more strict version of the problem requires these singularities to be Fuchsian, i.e. poles of first order (logarithmic poles), including at infinity. A monodromy group is prescribed, by means of a finite-dimensional complex representation of the fundamental group of the complement in the Riemann sphere of those points, plus the point at infinity, up to equivalence. The fundamental group is actually a free group, on 'circuits' going once round each missing point, starting and ending at a given base point. The question is whether the mapping from these Fuchsian equations to classes of representations is surjective.

History
This problem is more commonly called the Riemann–Hilbert problem. 
It led to several bijective correspondences known as 'Riemann–Hilbert correspondences', for flat algebraic connections with regular singularities and more generally regular holonomic D-modules or flat algebraic connections with regular singularities on principal G-bundles, in all dimensions. 
The history of proofs involving a single complex variable is complicated. Josip Plemelj published a solution in 1908. This work was for a long time accepted as a definitive solution; there was work of G. D. Birkhoff in 1913 also.  wrote a  monograph  summing up his work. A few years later the Soviet mathematician Yuliy S. Il'yashenko and others started raising doubts about Plemelj's work. In fact, Plemelj correctly proves that any monodromy group can be realised by a regular linear system which is Fuchsian at all but one of the singular points. Plemelj's claim that the system can be made Fuchsian at the last point as well is wrong, unless the monodromy is diagonalizable there.
 
Indeed  found a counterexample to Plemelj's statement.  
This is commonly viewed as providing a counterexample to the precise question Hilbert had in mind;
Bolibrukh showed that for a given pole configuration certain monodromy groups can be realised by regular, but not by Fuchsian systems. (In 1990 he published the thorough study of the case of regular systems of size 3 exhibiting all situations when such counterexamples exists. In 1978 Dekkers had shown that for systems of size 2 Plemelj's claim is true.  and independently  showed that for any size, an irreducible monodromy group can be realised by a Fuchsian system. The codimension of the variety of monodromy groups of regular systems of size  with  poles which cannot be realised by Fuchsian systems equals .) Parallel to this the Grothendieck school of algebraic geometry had become interested in questions of 'integrable connections on algebraic varieties', generalising the theory of linear differential equations on Riemann surfaces. Pierre Deligne proved a precise  Riemann–Hilbert correspondence in this general context (a major point being to say what 'Fuchsian' means). With work by Helmut Röhrl, the case in one complex dimension was again covered.

See also

Isomonodromic deformation

References

Deligne, Pierre (1970). Équations différentielles à points singuliers réguliers. (French) Lecture Notes in Mathematics, Vol. 163. Springer-Verlag, Berlin-New York, 1970. 133 pp. MR0417174

Gérard, Raymond (1969). Le problème de Riemann-Hilbert sur une variété analytique complexe. (French) Ann. Inst. Fourier (Grenoble) 19 (1969), fasc. 2, 1--32. MR0281946

Röhrl, Helmut (1957). Das Riemann-Hilbertsche Problem der Theorie der linearen Differentialgleichungen. (German) Math. Ann. 133 , 1--25. MR0086958

External links
 On the Riemann–Hilbert Problem (archive.org copy )

21
Ordinary differential equations
Algebraic curves